South Dade Senior High School is a secondary school in unincorporated Miami-Dade County, Florida, just north of Homestead.

It is the older of the two public high schools that serves the population of parts of the city of Homestead, Redland, Naranja, Leisure City, and other unincorporated areas.

South Dade is currently structured as a magnet school with International Baccalaureate and five other Academic programs that draw students from throughout the region.

History
South Dade was established in 1953, consolidating the original Homestead High School with the agricultural program and grades 9-12 of the Redland Farm Life School. 
Following the devastation of Hurricane Andrew in August 1992, the school building was repaired and a new science wing opened in 1995.  
In 2008, a state of the art facility with over 420,000 square feet opened.

School journalism
The Scene - school newspaper 
Southernaire - school yearbook
BUCTV - school TV production

Magnet academies
Academy of Professional Services
 Agritechnology & Business Systems
 Landscape Design Architecture
 Sports & Recreational Turf Management
 Automotive Service Technology
 Materials & Processing Technology

Academy of International Finance, Business & Technology
 Information Technology
 Web Design Services
 Accounting Operations
 Business Supervise & Management
 Electronic Business Enterprise

Academy of Sports, Nutrition & Health Science
 Sports Administration
 Sports Medicine
 Nursing Assisting
 Childcare
 Culinary Arts
 Medical Assisting

Academy of Visual & Performing Arts 
 Symphonic Band
 Wind Ensemble
 Chorus
 Orchestra
 Dance
 Theatre Arts
 Visual Arts

Academy of Law Studies & Public Safety
 Criminal Justice & Legal Services
 Law Enforcement & Custom Operations
 JROTC
 Firefighter

Academy of International Baccalaureate (IB)
 French
 Italian
 Spanish

Athletics

Its athletic rival is Homestead High School.

 Baseball
 Basketball (boys and girls)
 Bowling
 Cheerleading
 Cross Country
 Football
 Golf
 Soccer (boys and girls)
 Softball
 Swimming (boys and girls)
 Track (boys and girls)
 Volleyball
 Wrestling

Wrestling
State champions (1995, 1996, 1997, 1999, 2000, 2001, 2003, 2008, 2013, 2014, 2015, 2016, 2017, 2018, 2019, 2020)

Bowling
State champions (2003) - girls

Football
State champions (2013)

Baseball
State champions (2014)

Notable alumni

 Marcus Hudson, football player for the San Francisco 49ers
Alek Manoah, baseball player for the Toronto Blue Jays, 2019 MLB Draft #11 overall selection
Jose 'Tony' Parrilla, three-time NCAA 800m champion University of Tennessee (1992-1994), 1992 and 1996 Olympian

 Victoria Principal, actress notable for her role as Pamela Barnes Ewing on the TV show Dallas
 Kerry Reed, football player for the BC Lions
 Antrel Rolle, football player for the New York Giants
 James Wiggins, football player for the Arizona Cardinals.

South Dade HS feeder pattern
 Avocado Elementary School
 Neva King Cooper Educational Center
 Redland Elementary School
 Redondo Elementary School
 West Homestead Elementary School
 William A. Chapman Elementary School
 Homestead Middle School
 Redland Middle School
 South Dade Middle School
 South Dade Senior High School
 South Dade Adult Center
 South Dade Skill Center

References

External links
 
 

Educational institutions established in 1953
Miami-Dade County Public Schools high schools
Magnet schools in Florida
1953 establishments in Florida